Franklintown is an unincorporated community in Jefferson County, West Virginia, United States. Franklintown is located near the Clarke County, Virginia border on County Route 340/1.

References

Unincorporated communities in Jefferson County, West Virginia
Unincorporated communities in West Virginia